Freestar Kharbangar (born 23 March 2001) is an Indian professional footballer from Shillong who plays as an attacking midfielder for East Bengal F.C. (R) in the I-League 2nd Division.

Career
Freestar Kharbangar began his career from the youth setup of Royal Wahingdoh in the U16 level and then moved to Shillong Lajong, where he played in the U18 team. He made his professional debut in the 2018–19 I-League, when he came on as a substitute against Aizawl FC in the 73rd minute.

In April 2020, he signed on a 3 years contract with the East Bengal F.C. Reserves team.

Career statistics

References

External links

2001 births
Living people
People from Shillong
Indian footballers
Association football midfielders
Footballers from Meghalaya
I-League players
Shillong Lajong FC players
East Bengal Club players